Paradromius is a genus of ground beetle native to the Palearctic (including Europe), the Near East and North Africa. It contains the following species:

 Paradromius amoenus Wollaston, 1864
 Paradromius amplior Machado, 1992 
 Paradromius arnoldii Kabak & Komarov, 1995 
 Paradromius bermejoi (Mateu, 1956) 
 Paradromius brancuccii Mateu, 1984
 Paradromius cylindraticollis Peyerimhoff, 1927 
 Paradromius dendrobates Bedel, 1900 
 Paradromius exilis Mateu, 1984 
 Paradromius exornatus Machado, 1992 
 Paradromius gandhii Mateu, 1984 
 Paradromius hariensis Machado, 1992 
 Paradromius insularis Wollaston, 1854 
 Paradromius jucundus Machado, 1992 
 Paradromius kocheri Antoine, 1963 
 Paradromius linearis (Olivier, 1795) 
 Paradromius longiceps (Dejean, 1826) 
 Paradromius longissimus (Landin, 1954) 
 Paradromius pilifer (Bedel, 1900)
 Paradromius proderus Fairmaire, 1880 
 Paradromius puncticeps Bedel, 1907 
 Paradromius purpurarius Machado, 1992 
 Paradromius riedeli Mateu, 1997 
 Paradromius ruficollis (Motschulsky, 1844) 
 Paradromius saharensis (Mateu, 1947) 
 Paradromius scholzi Machado, 1992 
 Paradromius steno (Bates, 1886) 
 Paradromius strigifrons Wollaston, 1865 
 Paradromius sublinearis Escalera, 1914 
 Paradromius suturalis (Motschulsky, 1844) 
 Paradromius tamaranus Machado, 1992 
 Paradromius vagepictus Fairmaire, 1875

References

External links
Paradromius at Fauna Europaea

Lebiinae